Frederick Fraser Palmer (July 14, 1925 – January 2, 1992) was a rear admiral in the United States Navy. He was chief of the United States Naval Reserve from September 1978 until October 1982.  Prior to that he was the commandant of the Fourth Naval District in headquartered in Philadelphia, Pennsylvania.  His awards included the Navy Cross, Silver Star and Distinguished Flying Cross.

References

1925 births
1992 deaths
United States Navy personnel of the Vietnam War
Recipients of the Distinguished Flying Cross (United States)
Recipients of the Navy Cross (United States)
Recipients of the Silver Star
United States Naval Aviators
United States Navy admirals